Aimia may refer to:

 Aimia, a loyalty and travel consolidator
 Australian Interactive Media Industry Association